The mesovarium is the portion of the broad ligament of the uterus that suspends the ovaries. The ovary is not covered by the mesovarium; rather, it is covered by germinal epithelium.

At first the mesonephros and genital ridge are suspended by a common mesentery, but as the embryo grows the genital ridge gradually becomes pinched off from the mesonephros, with which it is at first continuous, though it still remains connected to the remnant of this body by a fold of peritoneum. In the male this is the mesorchium, and in the female, this is the mesovarium.

See also
 Mesometrium
 Mesosalpinx

External links
  - "The Female Pelvis: The Broad ligament"
  - "Posterior view of the broad ligament of the uterus, on the left side."
 
 
 
 Photo at murraystate.edu (look for #3)
 Diagram at mcgill.ca

Mammal female reproductive system